Teruaki Yamagishi (born December 4, 1934) is a Japanese management consultant who works in Manaus, Brazil. He is the CEO of Yamagishi Consulting.

The Japanese Government has recognized his invaluable contribution in assisting Japanese Companies to build their plants in Manaus.

Order of the Rising Sun 
In 2008, Teruaki Yamagishi received the 4th Class, Gold Rays with Rosette order.

References 

1934 births
Living people
Businesspeople from Tokyo
Japanese chief executives
Japanese management consultants
Recipients of the Order of the Rising Sun, 4th class
Japanese emigrants to Brazil
Japanese expatriates in Brazil
People from Manaus